The University of Arts of Cuba / Instituto Superior de Arte (ISA) was established on September 1, 1976, by the Cuban government as a school for the arts.  Its original structure had three schools: Music, Visual Arts, and Performing Arts.

History 
The ISA has four schools, the previous three and one for Arts and Audiovisual Communication Media. There are also four teaching schools in the provinces, one in Camagüey, two in Holguín and one in Santiago de Cuba.

ISA offers pre-degree and post-degree courses, as well as a wide spectrum of brief and extension courses, including preparation for Cuban and foreign professors for a degree of Doctor on Sciences in Art.

Predegree education has increased to five careers: Music, Visual Arts, Theatre Arts, Dance Arts and Arts and Audiovisual Communication Media.

In 1996, the ISA established the National Award of Artistic Teaching, conceived for recognizing a lifework devoted to arts teaching.

Faculty 

José Villa Soberón, professor of sculpture
Evelio Tieles, Professor and Consultant Professor of Violin (School of Music)

Alumni 

Alexandre Arrechea, Cuban artist and sculptor
Alina Brouwer, Cuban Pianist, Composer, Recording Artist

See also
Cuban National Schools of Art, 1960s predecessor to the ISA

External links
 ISA Universidad de las Artes

Instituto Superior de Arte